Frank W. "Pop" Morgenweck (July 15, 1875 – December 8, 1941) was an American basketball player, coach, and team owner. He began his career in the National League in 1901, and won that league's championship with the Camden Electrics in 1904. After retiring in 1916, he became a coach and an owner of professional teams, operating teams in ten different leagues and in more than 18 cities. As a coach, he won the Metropolitan League title with Paterson Legionnaires in 1923 and Kingston Colonials in 1928. He retired as a coach in 1938 with over 500 career victories. He was enshrined into the Naismith Memorial Basketball Hall of Fame as a contributor in 1962.

External links 
 Frank Morgenweck @ HoopHall.com

1875 births
1941 deaths
American Basketball League (1925–1955) coaches
American men's basketball coaches
American men's basketball players
Basketball coaches from New Jersey
Basketball players from New Jersey
Chicago Bruins coaches
Naismith Memorial Basketball Hall of Fame inductees
People from Egg Harbor City, New Jersey
Player-coaches
Sportspeople from Atlantic County, New Jersey